Zygmunt Miłkowski, pseudonym Teodor Tomasz Jeż (March 23, 1824 in Podolia Governorate, Russian Empire – January 11, 1915 in Lausanne, Switzerland) was Polish romantic writer and politician who struggled for independence of Poland as leader of Polish Union. He became a member of the Serbian Learned Society in 1869, the society which preceded the Serbian Academy of Sciences and Arts.

Selected works 
 Wasyl Hołub
 Handzia Zahornicka
 Historia o pra-pra-prawnuku
 Hryhor Serdeczny
 Szandor Kowacz
 Ci i tamci
 Asan
 Uskoki
 Narzeczona Harambaszy
 Niezaradni (1884)
 Ofiary 1874
 Dahijszczyzna
 Rotułowicze
 W zaraniu
 Dersław Z Rytwian
 Za króla Olbrachta
 Nauczycielka
 Emancypowana
 Pamiętniki starającego się
 Od kolebki przez życie
 Nad rzekami Babilonu
 Rycerz chrześcijański 1889, A novel about Skanderbeg

References

External links 
 
 Biography of Zygmunt Miłkowski

1824 births
1915 deaths
People from Rîbnița District
People from Baltsky Uyezd
Association of the Polish Youth "Zet" members
National League (Poland) members
January Uprising participants
Members of the Serbian Academy of Sciences and Arts
Moldovan people of Polish descent
People from the Russian Empire of Polish descent